This is a list of American football players who have played for the Pottsville Maroons in the National Football League (NFL).  It includes players that played at least one match in the NFL regular season.  The Pottsville Maroons franchise was founded in 1920 and lasted until 1928, when the team relocated to Boston, Massachusetts and became the Boston Bulldogs.  The franchise folded the following the 1929 NFL season.



B
John Barrett,
Carl Beck,
Clarence Beck,
Charlie Berry,
Benny Boynton,
Jesse Brown,
Frank Bucher,
Johnny Budd

C
Joe Carpe,
Harlan Carr,
Les Caywood,
Stan Cofall,
Larry Conover

D
Harry Dayhoff,
Eddie Doyle

E
Walden Erickson,
Jack Ernst

F
Ralph Farina,
William Flanagan,
Adrian Ford,
Walter French

G
Earl Goodwin,
Myrl Goodwin

H
Russ Hathaway,
Pete Henry,
Denny Hughes,
Vivian Hultman

J
Heinie Jawish,
Walt Jean

K
George Kenneally,
Walt Kiesling,
Frank Kirkleski

L
Tony Latone,
Howard Lebengood

M
Armin Mahrt,
John McNally,
Bob Millman,
Dinty Moore,
Hap Moran,
Vern Mullen

N
Frank Niehaus,
Will Norman

O
Duke Osborn

R
Frank Racis,
Dick Rauch,
Paul Rebsamen,
Harry Robb,
Guy Roberts,
Joe Rooney

S
Eddie Sauer,
Eddie Scharer,
Gus Sonnenberg,
Herb Stein,
Russ Stein

U
Jack Underwood

W
Jim Welsh,
Barney Wentz,
Zeke Wissinger

Y
Frank Youngfleish

References

Pottsville Maroons Anthracite League Champions, 1924

 
Pott